Akre is a city and district in Iraq.

Akre may also refer to:

 Akre, Israel
 Akre (surname), a surname

See also
Aakra or Åkra (disambiguation)
Accra, the capital of Ghana
Acra (disambiguation)
Acre (disambiguation)
Akra (disambiguation)
Aqra (disambiguation)